Archaeogastropoda (also known as Aspidobranchia) was a taxonomic order of sea snails used in older classifications of gastropods, i.e. snails and slugs. Archeogastropoda are marine prosobranch gastropod mollusks, mainly herbivores, typically having two gills and a double-chambered heart, with the eggs and sperm discharged directly into the water. They were traditionally regarded as a relatively primitive group.

This older classification of the gastropods is based on the classification of Johannes Thiele (1925). This classification was not based on true phylogenetic relationships, but on more general affinities between the groups. In the last few years, two new cladistic taxonomies of the gastropods have been published (in 1997 and 2005). This has led to an extensive reclassification of gastropod taxa. The taxon Archaeogastropoda was found to be a paraphyletic group, and therefore unacceptable in a strictly cladistic classification.

In the 1997 classification, most of the former Archaeogastropoda were included in:
subclass Eogastropoda
order Patellogastropoda (limpets)
subclass Orthogastropoda
Superorder Vetigastropoda Salvini-Plawen, 1989 
Superorder Neritaemorphi Koken, 1896 (with the order Neritopsina  Cox & Knight, 1960).

A more detailed classification can be found on Gastropoda.

Older system of classification
Order Archaeogastropoda
Superfamily Pleurotomariacea
Family Pleurotomariidae
Family Haliotidae 
Family Scissurellidae
Superfamily Fissurellacea
Family Fissurellidae
Superfamily Patellacea
Family Patellidae
Family Acmaeidae
Family Lepetidae
Superfamily Trochacea
Family Calliostomatidae
Family Trochidae
Family Stomatellidae
Family Cyclostrematidae
Family Turbinidae
Family Phasianellidae
Superfamily Neritacea
Family Neritidae
Family Helicinidae
Family Hydrocenidae

See also
 Janospira

References

External links
 Sasaki T. (1998). "Comparative anatomy and phylogeny of the recent Archaeogastropoda (Mollusca: Gastropoda)". Bulletin 38. Tokyo.

Obsolete gastropod taxa
Extant Cambrian first appearances
Taxa named by Johannes Thiele (zoologist)